Patrick Maynard Stuart Blackett, Baron Blackett  (18 November 1897 – 13 July 1974) was a British experimental physicist known for his work on cloud chambers, cosmic rays, and paleomagnetism, winning the Nobel Prize for Physics in 1948. In 1925 he became the first person to prove that radioactivity could cause the nuclear transmutation of one chemical element to another. He also made a major contribution in World War II advising on military strategy and developing operational research. His left-wing views saw an outlet in third world development and in influencing policy in the Labour Government of the 1960s.

Early life and education
Blackett was born in Kensington, London, the son of Arthur Stuart Blackett, a stockbroker, and his wife Caroline Maynard. His younger sister was the psychoanalyst Marion Milner. His paternal grandfather Rev. Henry Blackett, brother of Edmund Blacket the Australian architect, was for many years vicar of Croydon. His maternal grandfather Charles Maynard was an officer in the Royal Artillery at the time of the Indian Mutiny. The Blackett family lived successively at Kensington, Kenley, Woking and Guildford, Surrey, where Blackett went to preparatory school. His main hobbies were model aeroplanes and crystal radio. When he went for interview for entrance to the Royal Naval College, Osborne, Isle of Wight, Charles Rolls had completed his cross-channel flight the previous day and Blackett who had tracked the flight on his crystal set was able to expound lengthily on the subject. He was accepted and spent two years there before moving on to Dartmouth where he was "usually head of his class".

In August 1914 on the outbreak of World War I Blackett was assigned to active service as a midshipman. He was transferred to the Cape Verde Islands on HMS Carnarvon and was present at the Battle of the Falkland Islands. He was then transferred to HMS Barham and saw much action at the Battle of Jutland. While on HMS Barham, Blackett was co-inventor of a gunnery device on which the Admiralty took out a patent. In 1916 he applied to join the RNAS but his application was refused. In October that year he became a sub-lieutenant on HMS P17 on Dover patrol, and in July 1917 he was posted to HMS Sturgeon in the Harwich Force under Admiral Tyrwhitt. Blackett was particularly concerned by the poor quality of gunnery in the force compared with that of the enemy and of his own previous experience, and started to read science textbooks. He was promoted to lieutenant in May 1918, but had decided to leave the Navy. Then, in January 1919, the Admiralty sent the officers whose training had been interrupted by the war to the University of Cambridge for a course of general duties. On his first night at Magdalene College, Cambridge, he met Kingsley Martin and Geoffrey Webb, later recalling that he had never before, in his naval training, heard intellectual conversation. Blackett was impressed by the prestigious Cavendish Laboratory, and left the Navy to study mathematics and physics at Cambridge.

Career and research
After graduating from Magdalene College in 1921, Blackett spent ten years working at the Cavendish Laboratory as an experimental physicist with Ernest Rutherford and in 1923 became a fellow of King's College, Cambridge, a position he held until 1933.

Rutherford had found out that the nucleus of the nitrogen atom could be disintegrated by firing fast alpha particles into nitrogen. He asked Blackett to use a cloud chamber to find visible tracks of this disintegration, and by 1925, he had taken 23,000 photographs showing 415,000 tracks of ionized particles. Eight of these were forked, and this showed that the nitrogen atom-alpha particle combination had formed an atom of fluorine, which then disintegrated into an isotope of oxygen 17 and a proton. Blackett published the results of his experiments in 1925. He thus became the first person to deliberately transmute one element into another.

Blackett spent some time in 1924–1925 at Göttingen, Germany, working with James Franck on atomic spectra. In 1932, working with Giuseppe Occhialini, he devised a system of Geiger counters which took photographs only when a cosmic ray particle traversed the chamber. They found 500 tracks of high energy cosmic ray particles in 700 automatic exposures. In 1933, Blackett discovered fourteen tracks which confirmed the existence of the positron and revealed the now instantly recognisable opposing spiral traces of positron/electron pair production. This work and that on annihilation radiation made him one of the first and leading experts on anti-matter.

That year he moved to Birkbeck, University of London, as professor of Physics for four years. Then in 1937 he went to the Victoria University of Manchester where he was elected to the Langworthy Professorship and created a major international research laboratory. The Blackett Memorial Hall and Blackett lecture theatre at the University of Manchester were named after him.

In 1947, Blackett introduced a theory to account for the Earth's magnetic field as a function of its rotation, with the hope that it would unify both the electromagnetic force and the force of gravity. He spent a number of years developing high-quality magnetometers to test his theory, and eventually found it to be without merit. His work on the subject, however, led him into the field of geophysics, where he eventually helped process data relating to paleomagnetism and helped to provide strong evidence for continental drift.

In 1948 he was awarded the Nobel Prize in Physics, for his investigation of cosmic rays using his invention of the counter-controlled cloud chamber.

Blackett was appointed head of the Physics Department of Imperial College London in 1953 and retired in July 1963. The Physics department building of Imperial College, the Blackett Laboratory is named in his honour.

In 1957 Blackett gave the presidential address ("Technology and World Advancement") to the British Association meeting in Dublin. In 1965 he was invited to deliver the MacMillan Memorial Lecture to the Institution of Engineers and Shipbuilders in Scotland. He chose the subject "Continental Drift".

World War II and operational research
In 1935 Blackett was invited to join the Aeronautical Research Committee chaired by Sir Henry Tizard. The committee was effective pressing for the early installation of Radar for air defence. In the early part of World War II, Blackett served on various committees and spent time at the Royal Aircraft Establishment (RAE) Farnborough, where he made a major contribution to the design of the Mark XIV bomb sight which allowed bombs to be released without a level bombing run beforehand. In 1940–41 Blackett served on the MAUD Committee which concluded that an atomic bomb was feasible. He disagreed with the committee's conclusion that Britain could produce an atomic bomb by 1943, and recommended that the project should be discussed with the Americans. He was elected a Fellow of the Royal Society (FRS) in 1933 and awarded its Royal Medal in 1940.

In August 1940 Blackett became scientific adviser to Lieutenant General Sir Frederick Pile, Commander in Chief of Anti-Aircraft Command and thus began the work that resulted in the field of study known as operational research (OR). He was director of Operational Research with the Admiralty from 1942 to 1945, and his work with E. J. Williams improved the survival odds of convoys, presented counter-intuitive but correct recommendations for the armour-plating of aircraft and achieved many other successes. His aim, he said, was to find numbers on which to base strategy, not gusts of emotion. During the war he criticised the assumptions in Lord Cherwell's dehousing paper and sided with Tizard who argued that fewer resources should go to RAF Bomber Command for the area bombing offensive and more to the other armed forces, as his studies had shown the ineffectiveness of the bombing strategies, as opposed to the importance of fighting off the German U-boats, which were heavily affecting the war effort with their sinkings of merchant ships. In this opinion he chafed against the existing military authority and was cut out of various circles of communications. However, after the war, the Allied Strategic Bombing Survey proved Blackett correct.

Politics
Blackett became friends with Kingsley Martin, later editor of the New Statesman, while an undergraduate and became committed to the left. Politically he identified himself as a socialist, and often campaigned on behalf of the Labour Party. In the late 1940s, Blackett became known for his radical political opinions, which included his belief that Britain ought not develop atomic weapons. He was considered too far to the left for the Labour Government 1945–1951 to employ, and he returned to academic life. His internationalism found expression in his strong support for India. There in 1947 he met Jawaharlal Nehru, who sought his advice on the research and development needs of the Indian armed forces and for the next 20 years he was a frequent visitor and advisor on military and civil science. These visits deepened his concern for the underprivileged and the poor. He was convinced that the problem could be solved by applying science and technology and he used his scientific prestige to try to persuade scientists that one of their first duties was to use their skill to ensure a decent life for all mankind.  Before underdevelopment became a popular issue he proposed in a presidential address to the British Association that Britain should devote 1% of its national income to the economic improvement of the third world and he was later one of the prime movers in the foundation of the Overseas Development Institute. He was the senior member of a group of scientists which met regularly to discuss scientific and technological policy during the 13 years when the Labour Party was out of office, and this group became influential when Harold Wilson became leader of the Party. Blackett's ideas led directly to the creation of the Ministry of Technology as soon as the Wilson government was formed and he insisted that the first priority was revival of the computer industry. He did not enter open politics, but worked for a year as a civil servant. He remained deputy chairman of the Minister's Advisory Council throughout the administration's life, and was also personal scientific adviser to the Minister.

Publications
 Fear, War, and the Bomb: The Military and Political Consequences of Atomic Energy (1948)
 
 Studies of War: Nuclear and Conventional (1962)

Influence in fiction
 Blackett's theories of planetary magnetism and gravity were taken up by the science fiction author James Blish, who cited the Blackett effect as the theoretical "basis" behind his "spindizzy" antigravity drive.
 In his close friend C. P. Snow's novel sequence Strangers and Brothers (1940–1974), aspects of Blackett's personality are drawn upon for the left-wing physicist Francis Getliffe.
 Blackett and his dictum, "You can't run a war on gusts of emotion", appear in the 'alternative' WWII novel, Gravity's Rainbow.

Personal life
Blackett was an agnostic or atheist. Blackett had refused many honours in the manner of a radical of the twenties but accepted a Companion of Honour in the 1965 Birthday Honours, and was appointed to the Order of Merit in 1967. He was created a life peer on 27 January 1969 as Baron Blackett, of Chelsea in Greater London. However, the greatest honour of all for him was when he was made President of the Royal Society in 1965. The crater Blackett on the Moon is named after him.

Blackett married Constanza Bayon (1899–1986) in 1924. They had one son and one daughter. 

Blackett died on 13 July, 1974 at the age 76, his ashes are buried in the Kensal Green Cemetery, London.

Bernard Lovell wrote of Blackett: "Those who worked with Blackett in the laboratory were dominated by his immensely powerful personality, and those who knew him elsewhere soon discovered that the public image thinly veiled a sensitive and humane spirit".

Edward Bullard said that he was the most versatile and best loved physicist of his generation and that his achievement was also without rival: "he was wonderfully intelligent, charming, fun to be with, dignified and handsome".

In 2016, the house that Blackett lived in from 1953 to 1969 (48 Paultons Square, Chelsea, London) has received an English Heritage Blue Plaque

In July 2022, the Royal Navy named an experimental ship after Blackett in honour of his service to the Royal Navy and country; XV Patrick Blackett (X01) will be used by the Royal Navy to experiment with autonomous technologies.

See also
 List of presidents of the Royal Society

References

Further reading
Books
 
 
 
Articles
 Times Obituary July 1974
 Staff. Patrick Maynard Stuart Blackett website of www.nobel-winners.com
 
 Blog, Patrick M.S. Blackett Biography about his development of the Wilson cloud chamber method, and his discoveries therewith in the fields of nuclear physics and cosmic radiation.
 Staff. The Imperial College Physics Department (the 'Blackett Lab') website of Imperial College London

External links
 
 Television appearance
 Oral History interview transcript with Patrick Blackett on 17 December 1962, American Institute of Physics, Niels Bohr Library and Archives - interview conducted by John L. Heilbron at the Imperial College of Science and Technology, London, England
 Nobelprize.org biography
 Biography of Patrick Blackett from the Institute for Operations Research and the Management Sciences (INFORMS)
 
 

1897 births
1974 deaths
20th-century  British physicists
Academics of Birkbeck, University of London
Academics of Imperial College London
Academics of the Victoria University of Manchester
Alumni of King's College, Cambridge
Alumni of Magdalene College, Cambridge
British operations researchers
English Nobel laureates
Fellows of King's College, Cambridge
English atheists
English agnostics
Experimental physicists
Fellows of the Royal Society
Foreign associates of the National Academy of Sciences
Foreign Members of the USSR Academy of Sciences
Labour Party (UK) life peers
Life peers created by Elizabeth II
Members of the Fabian Society
Members of the Order of Merit
Members of the Order of the Companions of Honour
Nobel laureates in Physics
Presidents of the British Science Association
Presidents of the Royal Society
Recipients of the Copley Medal
Royal Medal winners
People educated at the Royal Naval College, Osborne
Members of the German Academy of Sciences at Berlin
Deans of the Royal College of Science
Recipients of the Dalton Medal
Tectonicists
Burials at Kensal Green Cemetery
Royal Navy personnel of World War II
Military personnel from London